União Desportiva de Santana,  known as Santana, is a Portuguese football club from Santana, Madeira. Founded in 1981, it currently holds home games at Manuel Marques da Trindade, with a capacity of 3,000 seats.

Santana was first promoted to the third category of Portuguese football in 2007–08. Santana were relegated back to the Terceira Divisão after gaining only 3 points in the 2009/10 season.

Backroom staff
 Paulo Abreu – Manager
 David Batista – Assistant manager
 Zé Barreiras – Assistant manager
 Marcelino Andrade – Doctor
 Márcio Sousa – Masseur
 António Candelária – Chairman
 Rogério Gouveia – Vice-chairman
 Nélio Mendonça – Secretary

External links
Official website 
ZeroZero team profile

Football clubs in Portugal
Association football clubs established in 1981
1981 establishments in Portugal